Sri Manakula Vinayagar Engineering College (SMVEC) (French: Collège d'ingénieurs Sri Manakula Vinayagar) Puducherry, union territory, India. SMVEC was established in the year 1999.

Location and access
The college is situated on Puducherry-Villupuram road (Nantional Highway 45A) in Madagadipet, Pondicherry, South India.

Blocks
The blocks (buildings) in the college campus are
 Administration Block
 Science and Humanities Block
 School of Architecture Block
 Mechanical Block
 EEE block 
 ECE Block
 University Block
 College Canteen
 Workshop
 Fluid Mechanics Laboratory
 Machinery Laboratory
 Boys Hostel
 Girls Hostel

Courses

 BTech – Electronics and Communication Engineering
 BTech – Electrical and Electronics Engineering
 BTech – Computer Science and Engineering
 BTech – Information Technology
 BTech – Instrumentation and Control Engineering
 BTech – Mechanical Engineering
 BTech – Civil Engineering
 BTech – Bio Medical Engineering
 BTech – Mechatronics Engineering
 BTech – Computer Science and Business
 BTech – Fashion Technology
 BTech – Artificial Intelligence and Data Science
 BTech – Computer and Communication Engineering
 BArch – School of Architecture
 MTech – Electronics and Communication Engineering
 MTech – VLSI & Embedded Systems
 MTech – Power Electronics and Drives 
 MTech – Computer Science and Engineering
 MTech – Networking
 MTech – Manufacturing Engineering
 MBA – Master of Business Administration
 MCA – Master of Computer Application
 PhD – Mechanical Engineering

Admission

BTech Courses:
A pass in the higher secondary examination of the (10+2) curriculum (academic stream) prescribed by the Government of Tamil Nadu or any other examination equivalent there to with a minimum of 45% marks (40% marks for reserved category) in aggregate of subjects – Mathematics, Physics and any one of the following optional subjects: Chemistry / Biotechnology/ Computer Science / Biology (Botany & Zoology) or an examination of any University or Authority recognized by the Executive Council of the Pondicherry University as equivalent thereto.

Number of attempts : Candidates should have passed the qualifying examination with a maximum of two attempts for General and three attempt for the candidates belonging to the SC / ST communities and two attempts for candidates belonging to the OBC / BCM / MBC / and BTC communities.

Age Limit : The upper age limit is 21 years on 1 July of the academic year ( Relaxation up to three years for candidates belonging to OBC / BCM / MBC / EBC and BT communities and five years for candidates belonging to SC / ST communities

BTech course (Lateral entry):
The minimum qualification for admission is a pass in the three year diploma or four year sandwich diploma course in engineering / technology with a minimum of 50% marks (45% marks for reserved category) in aggregate in the subjects covered from 3rd to final semester or a pass in any BSc course from a recognized University as defined by the UGC, with a minimum of 50% marks (45% marks for reserved category) and passed XII standard with Mathematics as a subject, with a maximum of 20% of the sanctioned intake, which will be over and above, supernumerary to the approved intake.

Alumni 
The main aim of the association is to maintain a link between the college and alumni and share details of mutual growth, achievement and advancement in fields.

The goals and objectives of the alumni association are contained in the constitution of the Alumni Association adopted in 2012 as its purposes

Library
The college has a library with 77,782 volumes of books, with Indian and foreign journals, periodicals, newsletters and magazines. Open access system is being followed. A separate reference section and reading hall is also available.

Transport 
The institution operates a fleet of 55 buses and a van for the students and staff to commute from the towns of effective transport facility covering every nook and corner of Puducherry, Cuddalore, Neyveli, Tindivanam, Villupuram. More than 80% of students use the transport service.

Trust

Sri Manakula Vinayaga Educational Trust (SMVE Trust) was formed with the avowed objective of imparting quality medical and technical education especially to the rural sections of the society. SMVE Trust was established in 1998 under the chairmanship of the beloved founder Shri. N. Kesavan and is progressing under the guidance of Shri. M. Dhanasekaran, chairman and managing director, Shri. S.V. Sugumaran, vice chairmanan, Dr. K. Narayanasamy, secretary. The trust has established "Mailam Engineering College" in 1998 and "Sri Manakula Vinayagar Engineering College" in 1999.

See also
Pondicherry Engineering College
National Institute of Technology Puducherry
Perunthalaivar Kamarajar Institute of Engineering and Technology

References

Engineering colleges in Puducherry
Universities and colleges in Pondicherry (city)